Gochbeyli or Aygestan is a village in the Khojavend District of Azerbaijan, in the disputed region of Nagorno-Karabakh. The village had an ethnic Armenian-majority population prior to the 2020 Nagorno-Karabakh war, and also had an Armenian majority in 1989.

History 
During the Soviet period, the village was part of the Hadrut District of the Nagorno-Karabakh Autonomous Oblast within the Azerbaijan Soviet Socialist Republic. After the First Nagorno-Karabakh War the village was administrated as part of the Hadrut Province of the breakaway Republic of Artsakh. The village came under the control of Azerbaijan during the 2020 Nagorno-Karabakh war.

Historical heritage sites 
Historical heritage sites in and around the village include a village from between the 15th and 19th centuries, and the Holy Resurrection Church built in 1741.

Demographics 
The village had 294 inhabitants in 2005, and 316 inhabitants in 2015.

References

External links 
 

Populated places in Khojavend District
Nagorno-Karabakh
Former Armenian inhabited settlements